Simone Theis (born 7 September 1940) is a Luxembourgian swimmer. She competed in the women's 100 metre backstroke at the 1960 Summer Olympics.

References

1940 births
Living people
Luxembourgian female swimmers
Olympic swimmers of Luxembourg
Swimmers at the 1960 Summer Olympics
Sportspeople from Luxembourg City